Dose dumping is a phenomenon of drug metabolism in which environmental factors can cause the premature and exaggerated release of a drug. This can greatly increase the concentration of a drug in the body and thereby produce adverse effects or even drug-induced toxicity. 

Dose dumping is most commonly seen in drugs taken by mouth and digested in the gastrointestinal tract. Around the same time patients take their medication, they can also ingest other substances like fatty meals or alcohol that increase drug delivery. The substances may act on the drug's capsule to speed up drug release, or they may stimulate the body's absorptive surfaces to increase the rate of drug uptake.

Dose dumping is a disadvantage found in extended release dosage form.

In general, drug companies try to avoid drugs with significant dose dumping effects. Such drugs are prone to problems and are often pulled from the market. Such was the case with the pain medication Palladone Once Daily formulation due to its dose-dumping effects when taken with alcohol.

References

Pharmacokinetics